Mark Benning (born April 19, 1964) is a Canadian former professional ice hockey player.

Early life
Benning was born in Edmonton as the son of NHL scout Elmer Benning for the Montreal Canadiens, and brother of former NHL players Jim Benning and Brian Benning. Benning played for the St. Albert Saints junior hockey team. He was late recruited by the University of Notre Dame, Benning played for two years and then transferred to Harvard University in 1984. Benning graduated from Harvard University with a degree in Economics in 1987. He was named a first-team All-American, an Academic All-American, All-Ivy League, All-ECAC and as of 2014 still holds the record for career assists by a defenseman at Harvard with 102. A three-year letter winner, Benning was also the 1987 Tudor Cup winner for Most Valuable Player at Harvard and the 1987 Bingham Award winner for most valuable athlete in the Harvard senior class.

After college Benning played for EC Bad Nauheim in the German Hockey League for two seasons before retiring from hockey in 1989. He then went to Stanford Business School and is now an options trader in San Diego, California.

He was inducted into the Harvard Athletic Hall of Fame in 2004.

Awards and honors

References

External links 
 https://www.harvardvarsityclub.org/article.html?aid=573
 http://www.thecrimson.com/article/1985/1/10/mark-benning-pthey-value-defense-in/
 http://www.hockeydb.com/ihdb/stats/pdisplay.php?pid=23258
 http://www.eliteprospects.com/player.php?player=275938
 http://www.ahcahockey.com/allamer/1987.php
 http://www.ivy50.com/story.aspx?sid=4/10/2007
 http://www.ivyleaguesports.com/history/honors/academic_all-america/harvard
 http://www.cosida.com/documents/2010/4/19/alltimeaaaindividualbyschool-1.pdf

1964 births
Living people
Harvard Crimson men's ice hockey players
Ice hockey people from Edmonton
Stanford University alumni
University of Notre Dame alumni
Canadian ice hockey defencemen
AHCA Division I men's ice hockey All-Americans